Akbağ can refer to:

 Demet Akbağ
 Akbağ, Refahiye